The Pioneer Cemetery, formerly known as the North Branch Cemetery, is a defunct cemetery established in c. 1851, and located along California State Route 12 in San Andreas, Calaveras County, California. It is the oldest known cemetery in Calaveras County.

The site is listed as a California Historical Landmark (number 271), by the California Office of Historic Preservation since September 3, 1937.

History 
The cemetery was established in c. 1851 and was originally named the North Branch Cemetery, named after a town of North Branch that once existed near the cemetery. Most of the graves in Pioneer Cemetery are unmarked.

Many of the graves from the former Poverty Bar Cemetery in Poverty Bar, Amador County were reinterred in the Pioneer Cemetery in 1962, while the East Bay Municipal Utility District worked on building Camanche Reservoir. A historic plaque marks the graves for the reinterred.

See also 
 California Historical Landmarks in Calaveras County
 List of cemeteries in California
 Pioneer cemetery, list of early cemeteries

References 

Cemeteries in California
History of Calaveras County, California
California Historical Landmarks
1851 establishments in California